Piotr Mowlik (born 21 April 1951 in Rybnik) is a retired Polish football goalkeeper.

Career

Club
In 1965, Mowlik began as an apprentice with LZS Orzepowice.  In 1966, he signed as a professional with ROW Rybnik where he played until 1970.  That year, he also briefly played for Unia Racibórz.  In 1971, he joined Legia Warsaw where he played 131 games.  He then transferred to Lech Poznań in 1977.  In 1983, he moved to the United States where he joined the Pittsburgh Spirit of the Major Indoor Soccer League.  He spent the 1985–1986 season behind starter David Brcic, seeing time in only one game.  On 1 March 1986, the Spirit sold his contract to the Tacoma Stars and he played his first game in Tacoma four days later.

National
He played for the Poland national team (21 matches) and was a participant at the 1982 FIFA World Cup, where Poland won the bronze medal, and also at the 1976 Summer Olympics, where Poland won the silver medal.

International

Personal life
He is the father of professional footballer Mariusz Mowlik and uncle of professional footballer David Topolski.

References

External links
 FIFA Player Profile
 Lech Poznan – in Polish

1951 births
Living people
Polish footballers
Polish expatriate footballers
1982 FIFA World Cup players
Association football goalkeepers
Poland international footballers
Legia Warsaw players
Major Indoor Soccer League (1978–1992) players
Pittsburgh Spirit players
Tacoma Stars players
Olympic footballers of Poland
Olympic silver medalists for Poland
Footballers at the 1976 Summer Olympics
People from Rybnik
Olympic medalists in football
Sportspeople from Silesian Voivodeship
Expatriate soccer players in the United States
Polish expatriate sportspeople in the United States
Medalists at the 1976 Summer Olympics
Lech Poznań players